The Dark Matter Particle Explorer, or DAMPE, also known as Wukong, is a Chinese Academy of Sciences (CAS) satellite which launched on 17 December 2015. The satellite was launched on a Long March 2D rocket from Launch Pad 603 at the LC-43 complex, also known as the South Launch Site, at the Jiuquan Satellite Launch Center. It is China's first space observatory.

DAMPE is a space telescope used for the detection of high energy gamma rays, electrons and cosmic ray ions, to aid in the search for dark matter. It was designed to look for the indirect decay signal of a hypothetical dark matter candidate called weakly interacting massive particles (WIMPs). 

The project is the result of a collaboration among research institutions and universities in Italy, Switzerland and China under the leadership of the Purple Mountain Observatory (PMO) of the Chinese Academy of Sciences (CAS).

Objectives
The scientific objectives of the mission are:

 the search and study of dark matter particles by conducting high-resolution observations of high-energy electrons and gamma rays.
 the study of the origin of cosmic rays by observing high energy electrons and heavy nuclei in the TeV energy range.
 the study of the propagation and acceleration mechanisms of cosmic rays through the observation of high-energy gamma rays.

Collaboration

The project is the result of a collaboration among research institutions and universities in Italy, Switzerland and China under the leadership of the Purple Mountain Observatory (PMO) of the Chinese Academy of Sciences (CAS). The DAMPE mission is funded by the strategic priority science and technology projects in space science of CAS. The institutes that have been part of the collaboration are: IHEP (Institute of High Energy Physics), CAS (Chinese Academy of Sciences), Beijing, China; IMP (Institute of Modern Physics), CAS (Chinese Academy of Sciences), Lanzhou, China; NSSC (National Space Science Center), CAS (Chinese Academy of Sciences), Beijing, China; PMO (Purple Mountain Observatory), CAS (Chinese Academy of Sciences), Nanjing, China; USTC (University of Science and Technology of China), Hefei, China; INFN (Istituto Nazionale di Fisica Nucleare) and University of Perugia, Italy; INFN (Istituto Nazionale di Fisica Nucleare) and University of Bari, Italy; INFN (Istituto Nazionale di Fisica Nucleare) and University of Lecce, Italy; INFN (Istituto Nazionale di Fisica Nucleare) and Gran Sasso Science Institute (GSSI), L'Aquila, Italy; DPNC (Département de physique nucléaire et corpusculaire), University of Geneva, Switzerland.

Results

The first scientific result of DAMPE came in November 2017 as the direct detection of a break in the cosmic electron plus positron energy spectrum at an energy of 0.9 TeV.  

In October 2019, DAMPE released its measurement of the proton component of cosmic rays, confirming previous results while also hinting towards new features in the energy spectrum.

Naming
The space observatory is nicknamed Wukong after the Monkey King, who is the hero in the classic Chinese tale Journey to the West.
Literally, "wu"(悟) means comprehension or understanding and "kong"（空）means void, so this name could also be understood as "understanding the void", relating to the undiscovered nature of dark matter.

The English name, DAMPE, was a backronym, which was named after a non-player character (NPC) in The Legend of Zelda, Dampé. In the game, the player needs Dampé to find the treasure, which matches with the mission of DAMPE (not finding dark matter, but finding the evidence that dark matter exists).

References

Astrophysics
Physical cosmology
Spacecraft launched in 2015
2015 in China
Satellites orbiting Earth
Space telescopes
Satellites of China
Spacecraft launched by Long March rockets